The Southern Exposition was a five-year series of world's fairs held in the city of Louisville, Kentucky, from 1883 to 1887 in what is now Louisville's Old Louisville neighborhood.  The exposition, held for 100 days each year on  immediately south of Central Park, which is now the St. James-Belgravia Historic District, was essentially an industrial and mercantile show.  At the time, the exposition was larger than any previous American exhibition with the exception of the Centennial Exposition held in Philadelphia in 1876.  U.S. President Chester A. Arthur opened the first annual exposition on August 1, 1883.

Highlights 

One highlight of the show was the largest to-date installation of incandescent light bulbs, having been recently invented by Thomas Edison (a resident of Louisville sixteen years before), to bring light to the exposition in the nighttime.  The contract with the Louisville Board of Trade was for 5,000 incandescent lamps. 4,600 lamps for the exhibition hall and 400 for an art gallery, more than all the lamps installed in New York City at that time, were used.

George H. Yater writes in his book Two Hundred Years at the Fall of the Ohio:

See also 
 Amphitheatre Auditorium, built with materials from the nearby dismantled remains of the Southern Exposition building
 Columbia Building
 The Filson Historical Society
 History of Louisville, Kentucky
 Louisville in the American Civil War
 Louisville mayors: Charles Donald Jacob and P. Booker Reed
 March 1890 middle Mississippi Valley tornado outbreak
 St. James Court Art Show, held in the same location
 Thomas Edison House

References

Further reading

External links 
 "'Went to the Exposition Tonight': Louisville's 1883 Southern Exposition" — Article by Kathryn Anne Bratcher of The Filson Historical Society
 "Southern Exposition: 1883-1887" — Article by Civil War historian/author Bryan S. Bush

History of Louisville, Kentucky
World's fairs in the United States
Festivals established in 1883
Recurring events disestablished in 1887
1883 establishments in Kentucky
1887 disestablishments in Kentucky